The 1951 Texas Longhorns football team was an American football team that represented the University of Texas as a member of the Southwest Conference (SWC) during the 1951 college football season. In their first year under head coach Ed Price, the team compiled an overall record of 7–3, with a mark of 3–3 in conference play, placing third in the SWC. The November 10 win by the Baylor Bears would be their last victory in Austin until November 25, 1989.

Schedule

References

Texas
Texas Longhorns football seasons
Texas Longhorns football